Nabil Ech-Chaabi, sometimes written Nabil Ech-chaabi (born 4 June 2001) is a Moroccan karateka. He won the silver medal in the men's kumite 84 kg event at the 2022 World Games held in Birmingham, United States. He won one of the bronze medals in the men's 84 kg event at the 2021 Islamic Solidarity Games held in Konya, Turkey.

Career 

In June 2018, he qualified for the 2018 Summer Youth Olympics at the qualification event held in Umag, Croatia. In October 2018, he won the silver medal in the boys' kumite +68 kg event at the Summer Youth Olympics held in Buenos Aires, Argentina. He represented Morocco at the 2019 African Games and he won the silver medal in the men's 84 kg event. He also won the silver medal in the men's team kumite event.

In June 2021, he competed at the World Olympic Qualification Tournament held in Paris, France hoping to qualify for the 2020 Summer Olympics in Tokyo, Japan. He was eliminated in his first match by Asiman Gurbanli of Azerbaijan. In November 2021, he lost his bronze medal match in the men's 84 kg event at the World Karate Championships held in Dubai, United Arab Emirates.

He competed in the men's 84 kg event at the 2022 Mediterranean Games held in Oran, Algeria. He won his first match and he then lost his next match against eventual gold medalist Youssef Badawy of Egypt. He was then eliminated in the repechage by eventual bronze medalist Uğur Aktaş of Turkey. He won the silver medal in the men's kumite 84 kg event at the 2022 World Games held in Birmingham, United States. In the final, he lost against Youssef Badawy of Egypt. He won one of the bronze medals in the men's 84 kg event at the 2021 Islamic Solidarity Games held in Konya, Turkey.

Achievements

References

External links 

 

Living people
2001 births
Place of birth missing (living people)
Moroccan male karateka
Karateka at the 2018 Summer Youth Olympics
Competitors at the 2019 African Games
African Games medalists in karate
African Games silver medalists for Morocco
Competitors at the 2022 Mediterranean Games
Mediterranean Games competitors for Morocco
Islamic Solidarity Games medalists in karate
Islamic Solidarity Games competitors for Morocco
21st-century Moroccan people